The Anping class is a class of offshore patrol vessels manufactured by Jong Shyn Shipbuilding Company for the Coast Guard Administration of Taiwan.

Overview
The class is based on the s of the Republic of China Navy but lacks the  main gun and has modifications for use in the law enforcement role. They are fitted for but not with the HF-3 and HF-2 anti-ship missiles with the same capacity as the Tuo Chiang class. In wartime they would serve as fast attack craft.

History
Construction of the first vessel began in January 2019 at the Jong Shyn Shipbuilding Company’s Kaohsiung shipyard. 

In May 2022, the Anping ship launched launched a HF-2 anti-ship missile for the first time in a joint exercise with the Navy. Indicating the ship has the ability to join battles during wars.

Vessels
A total of twelve vessels are planned.

CG 601
CG 601 Anping was launched on April 27, 2020 and entered service in December 11, 2020. Based in south Taiwan. It has also launched a HF-II anti-ship missile during a joint practice with the ROC Navy.

CG 602
CG 602 Chengkung was launched in December 2020 and entered service in June 25, 2021. She was delivered four months ahead of schedule. She is based in the Port of Hualien.

CG 603
CG 603 Tamsui was delivered in October 2021. Based in Northern Taiwan.

CG 605
CG 605 Cijin was delivered in April 2022. Based in south Taiwan.

CG 606
CG 606 Bali was delivered in October 2022. Based in Northern Taiwan.

CG 607
CG 607 Ji'an was launched in October 2022.

See also

References

Ships built in the Republic of China
Patrol boat classes
Ships of the Coast Guard Administration
Military catamarans
Fast attack craft